Berberis negeriana is a species of barberry, native and endemic to an extremely small area in coastal range of Bio-Bio Region in Chile. Common name include Neger's barberry and (Chilean Spanish) michay de Neger.

Its flowers are yellow. It is considered a threatened woody shrub and only two natural populations are known, near Concepción, Chile.

References

External links
 Pictures of Berberis negeriana and further information (Spanish).

negeriana
Endemic flora of Chile
Flora of central Chile